The Kupiansk civilian convoy shelling was a deliberate killing of Ukrainian civilians carried out by the Russian Army on 25 September 2022 on the Kurylivka-Pishchane highway near Kupiansk, Kharkiv Oblast, Ukraine. Twenty-six civilians were killed, half of whom were children.

At that time, the section of the road was in the "gray zone". The Ukrainian military was not able to reach the scene until 1 October 2022.

History 
During late September 2022, the Armed Forces of Ukraine staged an offensive attack to liberate Russian-occupied territory in the Kharkiv region. The town of Kupyansk-Vuzlovy and nearby villages were liberated on September 27.

Three days later, on September 30, Ukrainian soldiers found the bodies of civilians on the outskirts of the village of Kurylivka. The corpses were discovered in six cars and a van that had been shot and burned out while trying to leave in the direction of the village of Pishchane. 

Following news reports, seven witnesses to the tragedy came forward. They had managed to escape to the village of Kivsharivka. According to their testimony, on the morning of September 25, their evacuation convoy left Kurylivka in the direction of Svatove, Starobilsk, through what they believed was the only road open - all other roads had bridges destroyed, and the village was limited by a river and a swamp.  At about 9 o'clock their column was ambushed by a Russian sabotage group which shot at the convoy from both sides. Infantry weapons were used to kill the wounded and those who tried to escape.

Law enforcement officers subsequently identified all the victims of the motorcade as local residents. Among the dead was a carrier who organized the refugee convoy, he had charged 6,000 Hryvnias per person for evacuation and was a former resident of Kupyansk-Vuzlovoi.

During the shooting, two children – 1 years old and  years old – managed to escape. The children's parents died in the column. Preliminary data said there were about 24 dead, among them a pregnant woman and 13 children. Twelve of the dead had been named by October 20 2022.

A further victim was discovered on October 17 2022 – a 19-year-old youth was wounded who died in a forest lane from his injuries after walking 1.5 kilometres. The number of dead was finally reckoned as 26 people, 22 people managed to escape.

Some of the physical evidence (the bodies of the victims and the car) was examined by French experts. They discovered signs of the use of 30 mm and 45 mm high-explosive shells, as well as VOG-17 and VOG-25 grenades.

References 

Mass murder in Ukraine
Mass murder in 2022
War crimes during the 2022 Russian invasion of Ukraine
History of Kharkiv Oblast
September 2022 crimes in Europe
September 2022 events in Ukraine
21st-century mass murder in Ukraine
2022 in Ukraine
2020s in Ukraine
History of Europe
Russian war crimes in Ukraine
2022 in Europe
History of Ukraine